Henry McLean House is a historic home located at Fayetteville, Cumberland County, North Carolina. The original section was built about 1840, and is a two-story, side-hall plan, vernacular Greek Revival style frame dwelling.  A Victorian style two-story, four room wing was added between about 1875 and 1880. Additional rooms were added in the early-20th century.

It was listed on the National Register of Historic Places in 1983.

References

Houses on the National Register of Historic Places in North Carolina
Greek Revival houses in North Carolina
Victorian architecture in North Carolina
Houses completed in 1840
Houses in Fayetteville, North Carolina
National Register of Historic Places in Cumberland County, North Carolina